Maryna Bazanova (25 December 1962 – 27 April 2020) was a Russian handball player who competed for the Soviet Union in the 1988 Summer Olympics and for the Unified Team in the 1992 Summer Olympics.

Bazanova was born in Omsk and played for Spartak Kiev, TuS Walle Bremen and Werder Bremen. In 1988 she won the bronze medal with the Soviet team. She played all five matches and scored 13 goals.

Four years later she was a member of the Unified Team which won the bronze medal. She played all five matches and scored 19 goals.

She also won the World Women's Handball Championship three times, in 1982, 1986 and 1990.

She died in Bremen, Germany.

References

External links

1962 births
2020 deaths
Sportspeople from Omsk
Ukrainian female handball players
Soviet female handball players
Olympic handball players of the Soviet Union
Olympic handball players of the Unified Team
Handball players at the 1988 Summer Olympics
Handball players at the 1992 Summer Olympics
Olympic bronze medalists for the Soviet Union
Olympic bronze medalists for the Unified Team
Olympic medalists in handball
Medalists at the 1992 Summer Olympics
Medalists at the 1988 Summer Olympics
Spartak athletes
Honoured Masters of Sport of the USSR
Ukrainian expatriate sportspeople in Germany